Danielle Jadelyn (Hebrew: דניאל ג'יידלין) is an Israeli-British actress and filmmaker.

Early life 
Jadelyn was born in 1983 and grew up in Israel. She graduated from Arts Educational School London in 2006.

Career 
In 2007, Jadelyn had a recurring role in the first season of the British TV show Skins as Katie, the Water Bottle Girl.

In 2011, she played Yulia in Israeli drama series The Prime Minister's Children of HOT tv. 

In 2012, Jadelyn played "hostel girl" in the Russian film Dirizhyor (2012) and various other independent films. 

In 2015, Jadelyn starred along Yael Grobglas and Yon Tumarkin in JeruZalem, an English-speaking Israeli horror film.

Filmmaking 
In 2007, Jadelyn and her partner Steven Hilder created Jadelyn-Hilder Productions. In addition to various short films, they made a 40 minute film named The Ending which Jadelyn wrote and directed. 

In 2013, Jadelyn wrote and appeared in a short independent film titled Bunny Love, with Israeli director Veronica Kedar. It was sent to various festivals.

In 2014, she directed the film Folie à Trois (Hebrew: טירוף כפול שלוש) which was shown at the Israeli Utopia film-festival.

Filmography

Actress

Film

Television

Filmmaking

External links 
 
 Jadelyn-Hilder Productions
 Danielle Jadelyn short films on YouTube

References 

1983 births
Living people
British television actresses
British film actresses
Israeli television actresses
Israeli film actresses